Prakash Ram is two time elected member of Jharkhand Legislative Assembly from Latehar.

2005 Jharkhand assembly election
Prakash Ram won the 2005 Jharkhand assembly election from Latehar constituency on the ticket of Rashtriya Janata Dal.

2009 Jharkhand assembly election
In 2009 he was defeated by BJP candidate Baidyanath Ram just on the margin of five hundred votes.

2014 Jharkhand assembly election
In 2014 assembly election he contested on the ticket of Jharkhand Vikas Morcha (Prajatantrik) from Latehar (Vidhan Sabha constituency) and regained the mandate of people of constituency.

In 2018, Prakash Ram was suspended from his party because of cross-voting in Rajya Sabha poll. Party leader Babulal Marandi wrote a letter to election commission to nullify the vote of Prakash Ram as he has voted against the party.

Before 2019 Jharkhand state assembly election he left Jharkhand Vikas Morcha (Prajatantrik) and joined Bharatiya Janata Party, contesting on the ticket of BJP from Latehar.

References 

Jharkhand politicians
Bharatiya Janata Party politicians from Jharkhand
Year of birth missing (living people)
Living people